P1, P01, P-1 or P.1 may refer to:

Computing, robotics, and, telecommunications 
 DSC-P1, a 2000 Sony Cyber-shot P series camera model
 Sony Ericsson P1, a UIQ 3 smartphone
 Packet One, the first company to launch WiMAX service in Southeast Asia
 Peer 1, an Internet hosting provider
 Honda P1, a 1993 Honda P series of robots, an ASIMO predecessor

Media 
 DR P1, a Danish radio network operated by Danmarks Radio
 NRK P1, a Norwegian radio network operated by the Norwegian Broadcasting Corporation
 SR P1, a Swedish radio network operated by Sveriges Radio
 Polonia 1, a Polish TV channel of the Polcast Television

Military 
 P-1 Hawk, a 1923 biplane fighter of the U.S. Army Air Corps
 Kawasaki P-1, a Japanese maritime patrol aircraft (previously P-X)
 P-1 (missile), a Soviet anti-ship cruise missile

Science

Biology
 P1 antigen, identifies P antigen system
 P1 laboratory, biosafety -level-1 laboratory
 P1 phage, a bacterial virus
 SARS-CoV-2 Gamma variant, a strain of COVID-19 virus SARS-CoV-2 first detected in Manaus, Brazil in 2020
 ATC code P01 Antiprotozoals, a subgroup of the Anatomical Therapeutic Chemical Classification System
 Pericarp color1 (p1), a gene in the phlobaphene biosynthesis pathway in maize
 C1 and P1 (neuroscience), a component of the visual evoked potential
 P1 nuclease, a nuclease that works on single-stranded DNA as well as RNA

Other sciences
 Period 1 of the periodic table
 Pollard's p − 1 algorithm for integer factorization
 P-ONE - a proposed neutrino detector

Transportation

Automobiles
 P1 International, a car club founded in Leatherhead, Surrey, England
 Alfa Romeo P1, a 1932 Grand Prix car
 Allard P1, a 1949 British five seater two door sports saloon
 McLaren P1, a sports car succeeding the McLaren F1.
 Porsche P1, first electric car produced by Ferdinand Porsche in 1898
 P-1, development code name of the Subaru 1500 automobile
 P1 race class in the Le Mans racing series

Aircraft
 Abrams P-1 Explorer, an American aerial survey aircraft
 Dewoitine P-1, a Dewoitine aircraft
 DFW P.1, a passenger aircraft development of the 1916 DFW C.V
 Paradise P-1 LSA, a Brazilian light-sport aircraft

Rail
 P1 (AirTrain Newark station), a station on AirTrain Newark, NJ, USA
 Alsace-Lorraine P 1, a German steam locomotives class
 LNER Class P1, a class of locomotive designed by Nigel Gresley

Other uses
 Front-runner, or position 1 (P.1)
 Walther P1, an aluminum-framed variant of the Walther P38 pistol
 Pioneer One, an open source web series
 P-1 (submarine), a fictional patrol craft in the animated TV series Marine Boy

See also

 
 
 
 
 Pone (disambiguation)
 PL (disambiguation)
 PI (disambiguation)
 1P (disambiguation)